Poppintree (Irish: Crann Phapáin), is a neighbourhood of the large outer suburb of Ballymun, Dublin, Ireland. It is bordered by Glasnevin and Finglas. The area includes Poppintree Park. the Poppintree Sports and Community Complex

Etymology
The name is derived from the townland in the civil parish of Santry. It borders a smaller townland of the same name to the west the parish of Finglas.

History
Poppintree is derived from Pappan's Tree, named in honour of the 6th century abbot, Saint Pappan, who built a small chapel in nearby Santry. The area was the site of a large tree under which was held an annual commemoration service to Saint Pappan on the last day of July. The services ceased by 1845.

Transportation
Buses serving the area are 4, 13, 140, 220.

See also

List of towns and villages in Ireland

References

External links
Poppintree Neighbourhood Forum

Ballymun
Towns and villages in Dublin (city)
Townlands of County Dublin